Kasper Jørgensen (born February 9, 1977) is a Danish handballer, who has previously played for Danish Handball League side GOG. He is the current Managing Director of GOG

Jørgensen has made 2 appearances for the Danish national handball team, and during his youth years, he became World Champion with the Danish youth handball team.

References

External links
 player info

1977 births
Living people
Danish male handball players